Döwran Allanazarow (born February 23, 1986) is a Turkmen footballer who is presently playing for FC HTTU and is also a former player of the Turkmenistan national football team.

His latest match was in the 2014 FIFA World Cup qualification against Indonesia.

References

Turkmenistan footballers
Turkmenistan international footballers
Association football midfielders
Living people
1986 births